The Surveyor of the Navy also known as Department of the Surveyor of the Navy and originally known as Surveyor and Rigger of the Navy was a former principal commissioner and member of both the Navy Board from the inauguration of that body in 1546 until its abolition in 1832 and then a member Board of Admiralty from 1848-1859. In 1860 the office was renamed Controller of The Navy until 1869 when the office was merged with that of the Third Naval Lord's the post holder held overall responsibility for the design of British warships.

History
The office was established in 1546 under Henry VIII of England when the post holder was styled as Surveyor and Rigger of the Navy until 1611. Although until 1745 the actual design work for warships built at each Royal Dockyard was primarily the responsibility of the individual Master Shipwright at that Royal Dockyard. For vessels built by commercial contract (limited to wartime periods, when the Royal Dockyards could not cope with the volume of work), the Surveyor's office drew the designs to which the private shipbuilders were required to build the vessels. From 1745 design responsibility was centred in the Surveyor's office, with the Master Shipwrights in the Dockyard responsible for implementation. In 1832 the Navy Board was abolished and all of its functions were brought under the sole control of the Board of Admiralty.

Before 1832 the building, fitting out and repairing of HM ships were the responsibility of the Navy Board. Originally the principal officer most concerned was the Surveyor of the Navy, who estimated annual stores requirements, inspected ships' stores and kept the Fleet's store-books and repair-bills. In the eighteenth century his duties passed increasingly to the Comptroller of the Navy.
The office of Surveyor did not disappear, however, and after 1832, when the office of Comptroller was abolished, the Surveyor was made the officer responsible under the First Sea Lord for the material departments, and became a permanent member of the Board of Admiralty in 1848. In 1859 the name of the office was changed to Controller of the Navy until 1869 when the office was amalgamated with the office of the Third Naval Lord.

Office holders

Surveyor and Riggers of the Navy (1546–1611)
In date order (note that the post of Surveyor was frequently shared, which enabled the Admiralty to have competitive designs prepared for evaluation):
Surveyors and Riggers of the Navy
Vice-Admiral, Sir Thomas Spert, 1524-1541
 Benjamin Gonson  24 April 1546 - June 1549.
 Admiral Sir William Wynter 8 July 1549.
 Rear-Admiral Sir Henry Palmer 11 July 1589.
 Sir John Trevor 20 December 1598 -1611.

Surveyors of the Navy (1611-1859)
 Sir Richard Bingley  1611-1619.
 Thomas Norreys 12 February 1619 – 1625.
 Joshua Downing  1625-1628.
 Sir Thomas Aylesbury 1628.
 Kenrick Edisbury 19 December 1632.
 Vice-Admiral William Batten 26 September 1638.
 John Holland 16 February 1649.
 George Payler  1654.
 Sir William Batten 20 June 1660.
 Thomas Middleton 25 November 1667.
 Sir John Tippetts 5 September 1672.
 Edmund Dummer  9 August 1692.
 Daniel Furzer  22 September 1699.
 Daniel Furzer and William Lee (jointly)  19 October 1706.
 Daniel Furzer (alone) 16 November 1714.
 Jacob Ackworth  6 April 1715.
 Sir Jacob Ackworth and Joseph Allin (jointly)  11 July 1745.
 Joseph Allin (alone)  16 March 1749.
 Thomas Slade and William Bately (jointly)  4 September 1755.
 Thomas Slade and John Williams (jointly)  28 June 1765.
 John Williams (alone) 22 February 1771.
 Sir John Williams and Edward Hunt (jointly)  11 April 1778.
 Edward Hunt and John Henslow (jointly)  13 December 1784.
 John Henslow (alone)  7 December 1786.
 John Henslow and William Rule (jointly)  11 February 1793.
 Sir William Rule and Henry Peake (jointly)  20 June 1806.
 Joseph Tucker and Robert Seppings (jointly)  14 June 1813. (Seppings became Sir Robert Seppings from 20 February 1822.
 Sir Robert Seppings (alone)  1 March 1831.
 Sir William Symonds, 9 June 1832-October 1847
 Sir Baldwin Wake Walker  5 February 1848 – 1859.

Controllers of the Navy (1859-1869)
In 1859 the post of Surveyor of the Navy was changed to Controller of the Navy
Rear-Admiral Sir Baldwin Wake Walker, 1859–1861
Vice-Admiral Sir Robert Robinson, 1861–1869
In 1869 the post of Controller of the Navy's post was merged with the office of the Third Naval Lord

Timeline
 Navy Board, Surveyor of the Navy, 1546-1832
 Board of Admiralty, Surveyor of the Navy, 1832-1859
 Board of Admiralty, Controller of the Navy, 1859-1912
 Board of Admiralty, Directorate of Naval Construction, 1913-1958
 Board of Admiralty, Ship Department, Naval Construction Division, 1959-1964

References

Sources

Lambert, Andrew   The Last Sailing Battlefleet, Maintaining Naval Mastery 1815-1850,  published Conway Maritime Press, 1991.  .
Childs, David (2009). Tudor Sea Power: The Foundation of Greatness. Seaforth Publishing. .
Hamilton, Sir Richard Vesey (1896). Naval Administration: The Constitution, Character, and Functions of the Board of Admiralty, and of the Civil Departments it Directs. G. Bell and Sons. London.
Lavery, Brian (2003) The Ship of the Line - Volume 1: The development of the battlefleet 1650-1850. Conway Maritime Press. .
Principal officers and commissioners, Office-Holders in Modern Britain: Volume 7: Navy Board Officials 1660-1832 (1978), pp. 18–25. URL: http://www.british-history.ac.uk/report.aspx?compid=16833.

Attribution
This article contains text from this source http://discovery.nationalarchives.gov.uk/details/r/C712, which is available under the  Open Government Licence v3.0. © Crown copyright.

 

S
 
1546 establishments in England
1869 disestablishments in the United Kingdom